Annis "Big Red" Jensen (September 20, 1921 – January 10, 2015) was an American roller derby skater. In 1954, she was the first women's captain of the San Francisco Bay Bombers in the IRDL professional roller derby league. At the time of retirement in 1969, she was the oldest active skater in league history. 

In 1960, she was inducted into the Roller Derby Hall of Fame.

She returned to active skating, again with the Bay Bombers, in mid 1974 skating alongside Ann Calvello, Joan Weston, and Jensen's daughter, Barbara Baker.

Death
Annis Jensen died on January 10, 2015, in Arizona, aged 93.

References

1921 births
2015 deaths
Roller derby skaters
Place of birth missing
Place of death missing
Sportspeople from San Francisco